Mathieu Gorgelin (born 5 August 1990) is a French professional footballer who plays as a goalkeeper for Ligue 2 club Le Havre.

Club career
Born in Ambérieu-en-Bugey, Gorgelin developed through the Lyon academy. He first became a team member in 2010. During the 2011–12 season, he was loaned out to Red Star. He made his debut in Ligue 1 on 2 November 2013, in a 2–0 home win against EA Guingamp, entering the field after 32 minutes for injured goalkeeper Anthony Lopes, and keeping a clean sheet on his competitive debut for the club.

On 28 June 2019, Le Havre AC announced that they had signed Gorgelin on a three-year contract.

International career
Gorgelin has represented France at under-20 and under-21 level.

References

1990 births
Living people
People from Ambérieu-en-Bugey
French footballers
France youth international footballers
Association football goalkeepers
Olympique Lyonnais players
Red Star F.C. players
Le Havre AC players
Ligue 1 players
Ligue 2 players
Championnat National players
Championnat National 2 players
Footballers from Auvergne-Rhône-Alpes